Madireddy Venkat "Bobjee" Narasimha Rao   (born 11 August 1954), is a former Indian cricketer who played in four Test matches from 1978 to 1979. He was also a cricket coach.

Cricket career
He was picked to play against West Indies in 1978–79, but after two tests he was dropped. He was again brought back the following season for the series against Kim Hughes' Australian team, but again discarded after two Tests. In the 5th test against Australia at Eden Gardens, he played a crucial role in saving India from an imminent defeat. India required 247 to win on the last day and at one point was struggling with 4 wickets down for 123. Four key batsmen - Gavaskar, Vengsarkar, Vishwanath and Chetan Chauhan were already back in the pavilion when Narasimha Rao provided a match saving partnership with Yashpal Sharma who scored an unbeaten 85. India ended up with a score of 200 for 4 to draw the Test.
This was the last Test match played by Narasimha Rao.

As an alert close in fielder, however he did well in picking up eight catches. In first class cricket his record was very impressive - 4124 runs (avg 47.40) and 218 wickets (avg 24.20).

Coaching career
Rao returned to competitive international cricket albeit as an assistant coach of the Ireland Cricket team for the 2011 ICC World Cup. In December 2012, Rao became the first Indian cricketer to be appointed Member of the Order of the British Empire (MBE) for his contribution for promoting the sport and also for community service through cricket during the testing times faced by the ethnic community in Northern Ireland.

After Rao retired, he set up the St Johns Cricket Academy which  produced many stars like VVS Laxman, Mithali Raj, Bavanaka Sandeep, Hanuma Vihari and Tarun Nethula.

References

1954 births
Living people
India Test cricketers
Indian cricketers
South Zone cricketers
Coaches of the Irish national cricket team
Hyderabad cricketers
People from Secunderabad
Cricketers from Hyderabad, India
Indian cricket coaches
Ireland cricketers
Indian Members of the Order of the British Empire